Retrobulbar bleeding, also known as retrobulbar hemorrhage, is when bleeding occurs behind the eye. Symptoms may include pain, bruising around the eye, the eye bulging outwards, vomiting, and vision loss.

Retrobulbar bleeding can occur as a result of trauma to the eye, surgery to the eye, blood thinners, or an arteriovenous malformation.

In those with significant symptoms lateral canthotomy with cantholysis is indicated. This is recommended to be carried out within two hours. The condition is rare.

References

Eye injury
Gross pathology